Never Enough may refer to:

Albums
Never Enough (Patty Smyth album), 1987
Never Enough (Melissa Etheridge album), 1992
Never Enough (Public Access T.V. album), 2016
Never Enough: The Best of Jesus Jones, a 2002 album by Jesus Jones
Never Enough EP, a 2015 EP by Wild Adriatic

Songs
"Never Enough" (The Cure song), 1990
"Never Enough" (Boris Dlugosch song), 2001
"Never Enough" (Epica song), 2007
"Never Enough" (Five Finger Death Punch song), 2008
"Never Enough" (This Condition song), 2009
"Never Enough" (Kiss song), 2009
"Never Enough" (Tarja song), 2013
"Never Enough" (Koda Kumi song), 2017
"Never Enough" (Loren Allred song), 2017
"Never Enough", a song by Dream Theater from 2005 album Octavarium
"Never Enough", a song by Eminem, featuring Nate Dogg and 50 Cent, from his album Encore
"Never Enough", a song by L.A. Guns, 1989 from the album Cocked & Loaded
"Never Enough", a song by The Monkees, from their 1996 album, Justus
"Never Enough", a song by Mudvayne from The New Game
"Never Enough", a song by One Direction from their 2015 album Made in the A.M.
"Never Enough", a song by Poisonblack from the album Lust Stained Despair
"Never Enough", a song by Papa Roach from Infest
"Never Enough", a song by Toto from Kingdom of Desire
"Never Enough", a song by Wage War from Deadweight

Books
 Never Enough: Donald Trump and the Pursuit of Success, a biography of Donald Trump by Michael D'Antonio
 Never Enough: The Story of The Cure, a book by Jeff Apter; see 
 Never Enough by Joe McGinniss, about the life and murder of Robert Kissel
 Never Enough by Mike Hayes, A Navy SEAL Commander on Living a Life of Excellence, Agility, and Meaning